ConceptBase (a.k.a. ConceptBase.cc) is a deductive and object-oriented database management system developed at University of Skövde. Earlier development was done at University of Passau (1987-1992), University of Aachen (1992-2003), and University of Tilburg (1997-2013). It is mainly used for conceptual modeling and metamodeling in the domain of software engineering and related domains. ConceptBase.cc is free and open-source software.

ConceptBase combines the following features:

 Object-oriented concepts such as classes and inheritance
 Deductive rules evaluated by a Datalog engine
 Active rules conforming to the event condition action (ECA) paradigm
 Recursive function definitions
 Metamodeling with arbitrarily many abstraction levels (metaclasses, meta metaclasses)

ConceptBase implements O-Telos, which is
a variant of the knowledge representation Telos.

See also 
 MetaCASE tool

References 

 M. Jarke, R. Gallersdörfer, M.A. Jeusfeld, M. Staudt, S. Eherer, ConceptBase - a deductive object base for meta data management. Journal of Intelligent Information Systems, 4, 2, 1995, pp. 167–192, DOI 10.1007/BF00961873.

 Jeusfeld, M.A. (2009): Metamodeling and method engineering with ConceptBase. In Jeusfeld, M.A., Jarke, M., Mylopoulos, J. (eds):  Metamodeling for Method Engineering, pp. 89–168. The MIT Press, Open-access Edition.

External links
ConceptBase
ConceptBase ECArules

Object-oriented database management systems
Free database management systems
Tilburg University
RWTH Aachen University